Fyodor Reshetnikov may refer to:

Fyodor Grigoryevich Reshetnikov (1919–2011) - Soviet physicist and metallurgist
Fyodor Mikhaylovich Reshetnikov (1841–1871) - Russian writer and novelist
Fyodor Pavlovich Reshetnikov (1906–1988) - Soviet painter